Hunter A. Tootoo  (Inuktitut: Hᐊᓐᑕ ᑐᑐ; born August 18, 1963) is a Canadian politician who served as the Member of Parliament for Nunavut from  2015 to 2019. Elected as a Liberal to the House of Commons, he was appointed Minister of Fisheries, Oceans and the Canadian Coast Guard by Justin Trudeau on November 4, 2015. Tootoo resigned from that position on May 31, 2016, to take a leave from Parliament to seek treatment for alcohol addiction. He returned to Parliament by the end of July 2016 after the completion of his treatment program, but sat as an independent member for the remainder of the 42nd Parliament and did not run for re-election.

Before federal politics, Tootoo served as a Member of the Legislative Assembly of Nunavut, where he represented the riding of Iqaluit Centre from 1999 to 2013. Tootoo was Speaker of the Legislative Assembly from 2011 to 2013. He was a member of the New Democratic Party from 1997 to 1999.

Early life and career 
Tootoo was born in Rankin Inlet, the son of Batiste Tootoo, an Inuk, and Sally Luttmer (née Wolfe), originally from Montreal and descended from Lithuanian Jewish immigrants. He is a businessman in northern Canada, and was the co-founder of the Iqaluit branch of Arctic Insurance Brokers Ltd. Tootoo is a former member of the Northwest Territories Co-op Business Development Board, the Sport North Board of Directors, and Arctic Co-operatives Ltd.

Tootoo has long been involved in government administration. He served as regional coordinator for the town of Arviat in 1993. He became the administration officer for the NWT Department of Recreation and Tourism in 1995, and was named as the corporate control officer of the NWT Department of Finance later in the same year. In 1997, he became assistant director of the NWT Housing Corporation in Iqaluit. Tootoo was a member of the Public Service Alliance of Canada in this period.

Political career
He began his political career as a member of the Hamlet Council of Rankin Inlet. In the federal election of 1997, he ran for the Canadian House of Commons as a candidate of the New Democratic Party in the riding of Nunavut. He finished third, behind Liberal Nancy Karetak-Lindell. Tootoo spoke out against the Liberal government's gun registration program during this campaign.

Territorial politics
Nunavut became a separate jurisdiction in 1999, and Tootoo declared himself a candidate for the territory's first general election. He was easily elected in Iqaluit Centre, defeating three opponents. He was returned again in the 2004 election, although by a narrower margin, and again in the 2008 election.  During his time in the legislature, he served as Minister Responsible for the Nunavut Housing Corporation, Minister Responsible for Homelessness and Minister Responsible for the Qulliq Energy Corporation.

The government of Nunavut is structured along non-partisan lines, and all members are elected and serve as independents. Tootoo was often described as the unofficial leader of the legislative opposition. In 2003, he successfully tabled a motion to remove Jack Anawak from the Nunavut cabinet.

Federal politics
Tootoo was selected on July 27, 2015, as the Liberal candidate for the Nunavut federal electoral riding in the 2015 Canadian federal election. Tootoo stepped down as the chair of the Nunavut Planning Commission shortly afterwards. On October 19, 2015, Tootoo won the election, defeating Conservative incumbent and cabinet minister Leona Aglukkaq.

Minister of Fisheries, Oceans and the Canadian Coast Guard  
On November 4, 2015, Tootoo was appointed as Minister of Fisheries, Oceans and the Canadian Coast Guard in the 29th Canadian Ministry; Tootoo became the first Fisheries Minister to be from Northern Canada. He resigned from the cabinet on May 31, 2016, citing issues with addiction. Tootoo also resigned from the Liberal caucus and his cabinet role was filled by Dominic LeBlanc. The Globe and Mail reported that Tootoo entered treatment for alcohol abuse.

As independent MP
By July 25, 2016, Tootoo completed his alcohol addiction treatment program and resumed his duties as an MP starting with an invitation to a constituency open house on the 28th. In the same month, after a report by The Globe and Mail, Tootoo admitted that he had had a "consensual but inappropriate" relationship with one of his female staffers which led to his resignation, which had been kept quiet in respect for the privacy of the other parties.

In September 2016, Robert Fife of The Globe and Mail reported that after Tootoo broke off his relationship with his female staffer in favour of a relationship with her mother, the staffer damaged his Parliamentary office, which prompted Tootoo to tender his resignation to Prime Minister Trudeau.

He did not seek re-election in the 2019 federal election.

Post-political career
In 2020, Tootoo became the president of the Nunavut Curling Association.

Personal life
Tootoo is the cousin of hockey player Jordin Tootoo and the nephew of Manitoba NDP MLA George Hickes. Tootoo's mother is Jewish from Montreal. Tootoo is also an avid curler. He has played for the Nunavut team at three Canadian Curling Club Championships (2013, 2019 and 2021). In 2021, Tootoo was a member of the Wade Kingdon team at the Nunavut Brier Playdowns. They lost in a best-of-five series, three games to two.

Electoral record

Federal

Territorial

References

1963 births
Living people
Canadian businesspeople
Inuit from the Northwest Territories
New Democratic Party candidates for the Canadian House of Commons
Inuit politicians
Jewish Canadian politicians
Canadian people of Lithuanian-Jewish descent
Members of the Legislative Assembly of Nunavut
People from Iqaluit
People from Rankin Inlet
Curlers from Nunavut
Speakers of the Legislative Assembly of Nunavut
Liberal Party of Canada MPs
Members of the House of Commons of Canada from Nunavut
Members of the King's Privy Council for Canada
Members of the 29th Canadian Ministry
Independent MPs in the Canadian House of Commons
Inuit from Nunavut